John Manuel Munizaga Maturana (born 11 June 1985) is a Chilean former footballer. 

He started his career at Everton, and his last club was Iberia.

His twin brother Freddy is also a footballer.

References

External links
  

1985 births
Living people
Chilean footballers
Tercera División de Chile players
Chilean Primera División players
Primera B de Chile players
Municipal Limache footballers
Everton de Viña del Mar footballers
Naval de Talcahuano footballers
Lota Schwager footballers
Deportes Copiapó footballers
Deportes Iberia footballers
Association football midfielders